James Eric Todd (born February 15, 1982) is an American politician who served in the Kansas House of Representatives as a Republican from the 29th district from 2013 to 2016. He was defeated in the 2016 general election by Democrat Brett Parker, losing by a 53-47 margin.

References

Living people
1982 births
Republican Party members of the Kansas House of Representatives
21st-century American politicians
Politicians from Overland Park, Kansas